Enno Walther Huth (Altenburg, 8 October 1875 - Frankfurt am Main, 31 May 1964) was a German industrialist, pioneer of the Luftstreitkräfte.

Biography 
Huth was the son of Major Johann Ernst (1832-1897) and his wife Emilie (1838-1921) family with military traditions. In 1905 he married Elsa Bachstein (1878-1968), daughter of the railroad entrepreneur Hermann Bachstein. Left after 13 years as an officer in the military and from 1908 to 1912 he studied biology. He finished his studies and graduated in 1909, met in Berlin the French aviator Hubert Latham. Huth showed the desire to produce aircraft in Germany. Founded as the Albatros Flugzeugwerke in Johannisthal. Later aircraft produced under license by a French manufacturer. Later he worked with designers such as Ernst Heinkel or Hirth. The Albatros-Werke provided the first aircraft  for the Luftstreitkräfte. During World War I many aircraft and components were manufactured by Albatros. Huth was an intelligence officer.

Awards 
Huth was president of the National Federation of the German Aerospace.

External links

Bibliography

Related items 
Albatros Flugzeugwerke

Businesspeople from Thuringia
Businesspeople from Frankfurt
1875 births
1964 deaths